Chloé Tutton (born 17 July 1996) is a British breaststroke swimmer. She won a bronze medal in the individual 100 m and a gold in the 4×100 m medley relay events at the 2016 European Championships, and competed for the 2016 Summer Olympics.

Early life
Tutton was born in Pontypridd, Wales. Tutton took to swimming on holiday, leading her mother to enroll her in local classes. At age 12, coach Dave Haller recruited her, causing Tutton to move to Cardiff to advance her swimming. A bout of glandular fever forced Tutton to take an extended break from swimming at age 16.`

Career
Her first international meet was the 2014 Wales Commonwealth Games where she competed in breaststroke and the 400 meter freestyle, placing sixth in the latter event.  Following the Commonwealth Games, a dislocated shoulder forced her to take time off from swimming. She did not qualify for the British team for the 2015 World Championships.

The 2016 season was Tutton's breakout season as a swimmer. She set a British record in the 200 meter breaststroke at the 2016 British Championships with a time of 2 minutes 22.34 seconds. The record setting time won Tutton the gold medal. Her performance at the competition was just below an automatic qualifying time for the  2016 Summer Olympics in Rio de Janeiro. On 21 April 2016 the selectors announced Tutton had made the British swimming team for the then-upcoming Olympics.

At the 2016 European Swimming Championships, Tutton won bronze in the 100 meter breaststroke and placed sixth in the 200 meter breaststroke. She was also part of Great Britain's gold medal winning team in the 4 x 100 medley relay.

Tutton finished in fourth place in the 200 meter breaststroke at the 2016 Summer Olympics. She missed earning a place on the podium by 0.06 seconds. Tutton was also part of the British team for the 4 x 100 medley relay, which placed seventh at the games. As of 2016, her swimming coach is Graham Wardell.

References

External links
Chloe Tutton. Glasgow XX Commonwealth Games
Chloe Tutton. swimswam.com

Chloe Tutton on Team GB

1996 births
Living people
Sportspeople from Pontypridd
British female swimmers
Welsh female swimmers
Female breaststroke swimmers
Swimmers at the 2016 Summer Olympics
Olympic swimmers of Great Britain
Medalists at the FINA World Swimming Championships (25 m)
Swimmers at the 2018 Commonwealth Games
Commonwealth Games bronze medallists for Wales
Commonwealth Games medallists in swimming
Team Bath swimmers
Medallists at the 2018 Commonwealth Games